Child Under a Leaf (released as Love Child in Britain) is a 1974 drama film directed by George Bloomfield and starring Dyan Cannon. The plot follows an abused wife who strikes up an affair with an artist, but their relationship is threatened by the presence of her violent husband.

It was a Canadian Film Award nominee for Best Feature Film in 1975, but did not win.

References

External links

1974 films
Canadian independent films
Troma Entertainment films
1974 drama films
English-language Canadian films
Films scored by Francis Lai
Canadian drama films
Films directed by George Bloomfield
1970s English-language films
1970s Canadian films